1915 Lahore Conspiracy Case trial or First Lahore Conspiracy Case, was a series of trials held in Lahore (then part of the undivided Punjab of British India), and in the United States, in the aftermath of the failed Ghadar conspiracy from 26 April to 13 September 1915. There were nine cases in total. The trial was held by a Special tribunal constituted under the Defence of India Act 1915.

Out of a total of 291 convicted conspirators, 42 were executed, 114 got life sentences and 93 got varying terms of imprisonment. 42 defendants in the trial were acquitted. 152 persons were made accused .The uncovering of the conspiracy also saw the initiation of the Hindu German Conspiracy trial in the United States.

See also
 1929 CLA Bombing Case, bombing of national assembly by Bhagat Singh and associates 
 1929-30 Lahore Conspiracy Case, death sentence to Bhagat Singh and associates for the murder of John Saunders
 Ghadar conspiracy 
 Hindu German Conspiracy trial

References

Further reading
Ghadr Party's Lahore conspiracy case: 1915 judgment. A A Irvine, Thomas Peter Ellis, Sheo Narain. Archana Publications, Berkeley, CA, U.S.A. (2006). 
Panjab Digital Library
 

Hindu–German Conspiracy
Revolutionary movement for Indian independence
History of Lahore
Trials in India
Trials in Pakistan